Tailai County is a county in the west of Heilongjiang province, People's Republic of China, bordering Inner Mongolia to the west and Jilin province to the south. It is the southernmost county-level division of the prefecture-level city of Qiqihar.

Administrative divisions 
Tailai County is divided into 7 towns, 1 ethnic town and 2 ethnic townships. 
7 towns
 Tailai, Pingyang, Tangchi, Tazicheng, Daxing, Heping, Keli
1 ethnic town
 Jiangqiao Mongol
2 ethnic townships
 Shengli Mongol, Ningjiang Mongol

Demographics 

Climate

References

External links
  Government site - 

 
Districts of Qiqihar